Route 167 is a Connecticut state highway in the western suburbs of Hartford, running from the Unionville section of Farmington to Simsbury center.

Route description
Route 167 begins as West Avon Road at an intersection with Route 4 in the Unionville section of the town of Farmington. It proceeds in a northeast direction, crossing into the town of Avon after . In Avon, it continues north through the West Avon section of town for about  before entering the town of Simsbury. The road name changes to Bushy Hill Road after crossing the town line, where it also has a junction with US 44 and  US 202. Here, Route 167 turns east onto West Street and continues for another  before ending at an intersection with US 202 and Route 10 in Simsbury Center.

A section of Route 167 from Harris Road in Avon to the Simsbury-Avon town line is designated the First Company Governor’s Horse Guards Memorial Highway.

History
Route 167 was established as part of the 1932 state highway renumbering from previously unnumbered roads and has no major changes since.

Junction list

References

External links

167
Transportation in Hartford County, Connecticut